Club Deportivo Balonmano Castellón is a women's handball club from Castellón de la Plana in Spain. BM Castellón competes in the División de Honor, the top tier in the Spanish league system, since 2017.

Season to season

References

External links
 Official website

Spanish handball clubs
Sports teams in the Valencian Community
Handball clubs established in 1978
1978 establishments in Spain
Sport in Castellón de la Plana